Lootera is a 2013 Indian Hindi-language period romantic drama film directed by Vikramaditya Motwane and partially based on author O. Henry's 1907 short story The Last Leaf. It is the second film directed by Motwane after the critically acclaimed Udaan (2010). Set in the era of the 1950s, against the backdrop of the Zamindari Abolition Act by the newly independent India, it tells the story of a young conman posing as an archaeologist and the daughter of a Bengali zamindar. The film stars Sonakshi Sinha and Ranveer Singh in lead roles. Produced by Shobha Kapoor, Ekta Kapoor, Anurag Kashyap and Vikas Bahl, the film features music and background score by Amit Trivedi with lyrics penned by Amitabh Bhattacharya and cinematography by Mahendra J. Shetty. 

Lootera received high critical acclaim upon release, with particular praise directed towards Sinha and Singh's performance, thus proving to be a breakthrough for the latter, but was a commercial failure at the box office.

At the 59th Filmfare Awards, Lootera received 4 nominations, including Best Actress (Sinha), and won Best Female Playback Singer (Monali Thakur for "Sawaar Loon").

Plot
In the picturesque town of Manikpur, West Bengal in 1953, a landlord Soumitra Roy Chaudhary (Barun Chanda) goes to watch a jatra with his daughter, Pakhi Roy Chaudhary (Sonakshi Sinha), an aspiring writer. After Pakhi has an asthma attack from the ensuing excitement, she is rushed to her room and given medication. As she recuperates, her father comforts her and narrates the story of the invincible king of the Bhil tribe whose soul resided inside a parrot, telling her that she is the parrot within whom his life resides.

One day, after threatening the family driver into letting her drive the family car, Pakhi accidentally bumps into a motorcycle on the road, mildly injuring the handsome young man on the motorcycle. A few days later, the same man shows up at the door, introducing himself to the landlord as Varun Shrivastav (Ranveer Singh), an archaeologist who wants to study the land surrounding the temple that the landlord owns. Over the next few weeks, Varun charms the landlord and his daughter with his knowledge and persona and is invited, along with his assistant and friend Devdas "Dev" Mukherjee (Vikrant Massey), to live at their expansive mansion.

Soon, love brews between Varun and Pakhi as they bond over art and literature. Pakhi confesses her aspirations of becoming an author, while Varun reveals his desire to paint a masterpiece. Their love soon culminates into a passionate affair. Meanwhile, an act passed by the Indian government debars the power of landlords, causing tension in the Ray Chaudhary household. The ancient artefacts the family owns must be sold, and Varun helps arrange the purchases.

As Varun's stay comes to an end, he asks Ray Chaudhury for his daughter Pakhi’s hand in marriage, and preparations of their wedding begin. Before the wedding, Varun's uncle A.K. Bajpai (Arif Zakaria), who raised him, arrives and discourages Varun from marriage, stating that Varun will only give Pakhi grief because of the danger of what he actually does for a living—people like them are not meant to fall in love and have normal lives. Varun is conflicted but agrees and makes his choice: he and Dev escape that very night, along with all the valuables they stole from the landlord. On the wedding day, Varun is nowhere to be found, and it is discovered that the idols from the temple have been stolen and the currency notes from the purchase that Varun arranged of the family's artifacts are all counterfeit.

In the second half of the film, the story shifts to one year after the incident at the wedding. A sick Pakhi now lives all alone in Dalhousie. with her maid Shyama (Divya Dutta), as her only company. Her father has died, unable to bear the shock of betrayal by Varun, and she still hasn't recovered from her heartbreak. When police Inspector K. N. Singh (Adil Hussain) asks her to help him catch Varun, she refuses to do so, wanting only to forget him. Soon after, Varun and Dev turn up at Dalhousie for their next heist and stay at a lodge on Pakhi's property. Things turn ugly when the police get wind of their whereabouts and a chase ensues. Varun inadvertently kills Dev and a police constable and is wounded in the encounter. He removes the bullet and then goes to seek refuge in Pakhi's house.

Pakhi and her maid try to turn him over to the police, but he threatens them. Pakhi gives in, but she is nevertheless enraged and repels Varun's comforting advances and explanation. In a letter, she explains to him that she is dying of tuberculosis and will die the day the last leaf falls from the wilting tree outside the window. Her maid leaves the house promising Varun that he wouldn't be reported to the police.

Varun plans his escape but when his accomplice comes, he refuses to go, and instead stays behind to take care of the sick Pakhi. He tells her his real name, Atmanand Tripathi, and confesses that he has regretted letting her go since the day he fled. Soon, Pakhi warms up to him and her faith remains intact when each day she finds one last leaf remaining on the tree.

In the end, seeing Pakhi's condition improving, Varun decides it's time for him to leave, and he takes off, only to come face to face with a police blockade on the road, who proceed to shoot and kill him. Pakhi wakes up to find Varun gone, but the tree still has a leaf on it. She becomes suspicious and discovers that the leaf has been affixed to the tree by Varun. Every night, he would tie it on a branch of the tree so that she wouldn't give up hope. It was his masterpiece. Pakhi realizes the truth after she looks at the leaf closely and sees that it's been painted upon, and she smiles with tears in her eyes.

Cast
 Sonakshi Sinha as Pakhi Roy Chaudhary
Ranveer Singh as Varun Srivastava a.k.a. "Vijay" Atmanand "Nandu" Tripathi
Barun Chanda as Zamindar Soumitra Roy Chaudhary 
 Vikrant Massey as Devdas "Dev" Mukherjee
 Arif Zakaria as A. K. Bajpai
 Adil Hussain as Inspector K. N. Singh
 Divya Dutta as Shyama
 Shirin Guha as Devyani

Production

Development
Vikramaditya Motwane wrote the script of Lootera in 2005. Bhavani Iyer had co-written the script with Motwane. Ranveer Singh's character was created by the director whereas Sonakshi plays the role of female character from the book. Actor Ranveer Singh claimed that he was not initially convinced with his character in Lootera and had declined to star in the movie. With script readings he grew confident that he could play the role of a con man in the movie, and rehearsed extensively. In an interview with The Hindu, Sonakshi Sinha stated, "I play a Bengali girl. It's an authentic Bengali look of the fifties that I am sporting and they (the director and designer Subarna) have taken a lot of trouble to go through the kind of clothes, jewellery, hair and make-up done in that era. We have tried to replicate it. Vikramaditya has kept the make-up simple with only the kajal, kumkum, and some laali on the lips which is what the women used to do then. It was the most difficult shooting experience for me so far. In terms of my character, my look, my performance and the locations, everything had to be from an era I knew nothing about." The director insisted Ranveer's look be an amalgamation of James Dean and Dev Anand.

Filming
In November 2011, the filmmakers confirmed Sonakshi Sinha and Ranveer Singh for the lead roles. By December 2011, both the actors attended workshops for the look of the character, body language, speech as the film was set in Bengal in the era of the 1950s. Subarna Ray Chaudhari undertook extensive research to design the costumes for the characters to fit the required look. A romantic song was shot in December 2011. The first schedule was completed in Mumbai by end of December 2011. In January 2012, the set of the film erected in Dalhousie, where the actors were to shoot over for few days was destroyed due to bad weather that caused heavy losses amounting to 5 million. The weather forced the crew to trek through knee-high snow. However, certain scenes were canned at Kalatop, close to Dalhousie. The schedule was postponed to March 2012. The next schedule began in Kolkata from 23 January 2012 and continued in rural parts of West Bengal. Scenes involving Ranveer, Sonakshi and Barun Chanda were shot at the 11th century Jain temple in Deulghata and Belkuri. The area being Maoist affected, with great risk the entire cast and crew shot scenes under heavy police control. In March 2012, the team made its second attempt to shoot in Dalhousie, but actor Ranveer Singh injured his back and hence the schedule was postponed to May 2012. During May 2012, the team made its third attempt to shoot at Dalhousie wherein scenes that were left out to be filmed in the snow were shot by creating a set under artificial snowy conditions in summer season. Certain scenes featuring Shirin Guha and Arif Zakaria separately were wrapped up by March 2012. Along with potential 50 crew members the leading duo shot at The Itachuna Rajbari, Hooghly District. Old house scenes were later filmed in Purulia. The final schedule of the film took place in Mumbai, and was wrapped up in July 2012. The filming was complete by the end of August 2012 and the release date was scheduled to 29 March 2013. The first trailer released in March 2013 later revealed that the film would release on 5 July 2013.

Music

The music and background score for the film is composed by Amit Trivedi, with all song lyrics penned by Amitabh Bhattacharya. The music of the film is set in the styles of old Bollywood era. The composer opted to keep 2 "antara" followed by a "mukhra" in the songs, matching to the 1950s styles of composition. The composer recorded the Chennai String Orchestra for the score. The fourth song of the album "Monta Re" has its musical influence from the Baul musical tradition of Bengal. The complete film soundtrack album was released online on 29 May 2013.

The main background score theme for the film bears similarity to Rachel Portman's score piece "One Day (suite)" from the 2011 film One Day. It was also used in the trailer of the film. There were several reports of plagiarism. There is a song called "Shikayatein". The notes in the teaser (trailer) are a small piece from that song. This theme has one note more than the song Amit (Amit Trivedi) has created, which gives it the similarity. Music critic for Mumbai Mirror stated, "Amit has never in his life plagiarized, copied or stolen music from anyone and he's never going to start doing that. Call it a case of creative coincidence or creative convenience. But the similarity in the bunch of evocative notes that uplift an evocative, melodic piece titled One Day Main Titles from the original soundtrack of One Day, and the trailer of Lootera is unmistakable." She added, "Lootera's background piece, as heard on the trailer, lets soft piano keys play out the tune followed by violins building up the tempo. Portman's piece is so dense with emotion that Amit Trivedi's fans should be happy that he came up with something as similar in the Lootera track."

The audio was launched at PVR Cinemas, Juhu in Mumbai on 7 June 2013. The music composer claimed, "The music of this film is a tribute to R. D. Burman in terms of melody and orchestration." He performed the song "Zinda" and songs "Sawaar Loon", "Manmarziyan", "Monta Re" were performed by singer Shilpa Rao and lyricist-singers Amitabh Bhattacharya and Swanand Kirkire, live at the event.

The track listing was revealed on 29 May 2013 on the official social network page of the film.

Critical Reception
Songs
The soundtrack of Lootera received highly positive reviews from critics.

Rafat of Glamsham gave the album 4.5 out of 5 stars and wrote, "it will not be an exaggeration to compare the music of this album to late Pancham Da's swan song, the awesome 1942: A Love Story, the memorable music of which is still popular to this day. Says a lot about LOOTERA! A must have!" At Koimoi, Manohar Basu rated the album 4 out of 5 and claimed, "Amit Trivedi and Amitabh Bhattacharya with this album has perhaps delivered a masterpiece they can live off all their lives." Indibeats also gave it 4 out of 5 stars and observed, "if the music audience of our country are craving for quality, this must be one of the best selling albums of the year! Excellent!" Sankhayan Ghosh of The Indian Express stated, "Lootera has the kind of sublimity that will grow with time, and work even better with the film." He gave the album 3.5 out of 5. Yashika Mathur of Indo Asian News Service also gave it 3.5 out of 5 stars and said, "Lootera has fine compositions. No item numbers, no discotheque peppy tracks. It is a relaxed compilation of songs." Giving the album 3.5 out of 5 stars, Sheetal Tiwari of bollyspice.com added, "Lootera features a great combination of lyrics, music and vocals. Its beauty lies in its quiet intensity and Trivedi proves yet again why he is one of the best composers of this era." Business of Cinema wrote, "Good when we expect great from Amit Trivedi. He's set the bar so high up there, this meal cooks slow. Robbed, but not loot gaye." Karthik S of Milliblog stated, "Trust Amit to spring back with a vengeance from his recent middling state!"

Marketing
The first look and the trailer of the film was released on 15 March 2013. To match with the old world theme of the film, the film launch was held at the Liberty Cinema in Mumbai, which was constructed in 1947. The trailer was well-received and appreciated by critics, especially the featured background score. The second theatrical trailer was released on 10 June 2013. Unlike other films, the lead actress allotted forty days for the pre-marketing of the film.

Release
The film was screened at Yash Raj Studios in Mumbai two days prior to its release date. The release in India was on estimated 1,600 screens, emphasizing more multiplex releases rather than single screens.

Critical Reception
India
Critic Taran Adarsh of Bollywood Hungama gave the film 4 on a scale of 5 and wrote, "On the whole, Lootera is an intrinsically earnest and profoundly heartwarming story that stays in your heart. An absolute must for those who love romantic films or are romantic at heart. This one's a cinematic gem!". Raja Sen of Rediff rated 5/5 stars and noted, "Lootera is a gorgeous, gorgeous film, one that uses its period setting affectionately, with loving detail, and not exploitatively, as our cinema is wont to do." Meena Iyer of The Times of India assigned the film 4 out of 5 and noted, "Lootera is a love saga of yore." She added, "You may find this film boring if state-of-the-art, slow romance is not your idea of a movie outing." Deccan Herald gave four stars and stated, "Lootera is a flawed gem filled with moments of glorious emotions. The storytelling shows the hands of a masterly visionary who tends to dither in moments of deep drama. But then there is Sonakshi Sinha, who makes you forget all the blemishes in this unforgettable tragedy." Manohar Basu of Koimoi gave it 4/5 stars, commenting that "Lootera is one film that will overwhelm you. Vikramaditya Motwane has given a seraphic piece that glorifies cinema itself. The narrative is framed on a devastative tapestry and the film's climax knots up calamitously that will keep one absorbed." Saibal Chatterjee of NDTV gave it 4/5 and wrote, "An epic canvas, a quiet love story, a cops-and-robbers drama and an impressively sophisticated storytelling style: Lootera has all this and much more. In short, Lootera is a Bollywood miracle – a rare Mumbai film that is mounted on a lavish scale and yet dares not to play by the established norms of the marketplace." Critic Mayank Shekhar wrote, "God is in the detail, so is a good film–this is director Vikramaditya Motwane's second." Deepanjana Pal for Firstpost noted, "Lootera fumbles as a love story and without this pivot, Pakhi and Varun's story wobbles awkwardly. For instance, you have to wonder how loving a relationship is when a woman learns the man she loves has been shot, but doesn't ask him anything about his injury."

Box-Office

India
The film amassed a total of almost  over its opening weekend. Prior to its Japanese release, its final total finished around  nett.

Accolades
Note – The lists are ordered by the date of announcement, not necessarily by the date of ceremony/telecast.

References

External links
 
 

2013 films
2010s historical romance films
2010s Hindi-language films
Films shot in West Bengal
Films shot in Himachal Pradesh
Films set in 1953
Films based on short fiction
Films set in West Bengal
Films set in Himachal Pradesh
Adaptations of works by O. Henry
Indian historical romance films
Films scored by Amit Trivedi
Balaji Motion Pictures films